The European version of Planet Jedward is a compilation album by Irish pop duo Jedward. The album was released on 15 July 2011 and is a compilation of tracks from the duo's first two albums, Planet Jedward and Victory.

Background 
Following the success of Jedward at Eurovision 2011, Universal Music released a compilation album to showcase Jedward's sound in Europe. Despite its name, the European version of Planet Jedward is actually based around tracks from the duo's second album Victory, with seven of the 11 tracks coming from that album, including their Eurovision entry "Lipstick". The remaining four tracks are taken from the original Planet Jedward album.

Track listing

Chart performance

References 

2011 compilation albums
Jedward albums